Dora Mary Lush (31 July 1910 – 20 May 1943) was an Australian bacteriologist. She died after accidentally pricking her finger with a needle which contained lethal scrub typhus while attempting to develop a vaccine for the disease.

Early life 
Lush was born in Hawthorn, Victoria, the daughter of John Fullarton Lush, a clerk, and his wife Dora Emma Louisa . She had two brothers, who served as officers in the Second AIF and RAAF during World War II. She was educated at Fintona Girls' School and the University of Melbourne, gaining a B.Sc. in 1932 and an M.Sc. in 1934. She was an active sportswoman, being selected for the University of Melbourne's women's basketball team.

Research 
Lush worked at the National Institute for Medical Research, London, from early in 1939. She returned to Australia. Her work on the influenza virus was praised in 1940. She worked with Frank Macfarlane Burnet at the Walter and Eliza Hall Institute of Medical Research in Melbourne on a scrub typhus vaccine in 1942, as scrub typhus was a serious health risk to Australian soldiers engaged in jungle warfare in the New Guinea Campaign during World War II.

Death 
On 27 April 1943 Lush accidentally pricked her finger with a needle containing scrub typhus while inoculating a mouse. There was no effective treatment at the time for this often fatal disease. She died four weeks later, on 20 May 1943. Before her death she insisted that blood samples be taken from her to aid research. Unfortunately, the researchers were ultimately unable to develop a satisfactory vaccine.

Lush was cremated at Springvale Crematorium on 22 May 1943. A memorial tablet was placed outside the laboratory where she worked at Walter and Eliza Hall Institute.

Legacy 
The National Health and Medical Research Council now offers postgraduate scholarships named in her honour.

Lush Place in the Canberra suburb of Chisholm is named in her honour.

References

External links
Lush, Dora Mary (1910–1943) Encyclopedia of Australian Science
The Untold Story of Dora Lush, biographical podcast by Nicky Phillips

1910 births
1943 deaths
Australian bacteriologists
University of Melbourne alumni
University of Melbourne women
Women bacteriologists
Deaths from typhus
Deaths from laboratory accidents
Australian medical researchers
Scientists from Melbourne
Australian women scientists
20th-century women scientists
20th-century Australian women
People from Hawthorn, Victoria